The New Orleans Baby Cakes (formerly the New Orleans Zephyrs) were a Minor League Baseball team in the Pacific Coast League (PCL) and the Triple-A affiliate of the Miami Marlins. They were located in Metairie, Louisiana, a suburb of New Orleans, and played their home games at the Shrine on Airline.

The team began play in 1993 as a member of the Triple-A American Association (AA) when the Denver Zephyrs relocated to New Orleans. They joined the PCL in 1998. New Orleans has qualified for the postseason on three occasions and has won the PCL championship twice as the Triple-A affiliate of the Houston Astros (1998 and 2001).

At the end of the 2019 season, the team relocated to Wichita, Kansas, where they continue as the Wichita Wind Surge. Initially, the city of New Orleans hoped to bring a Double-A Southern League team to the city and continue operations as the Baby Cakes. However, due to Major League Baseball's reorganization of Minor League Baseball, the campaign ultimately failed.

History
Professional baseball was first played in New Orleans in the late 19th century. The city's longest-running team was the New Orleans Pelicans who played off and on from 1887 to 1977 primarily in the Southern Association. The Pelicans left after the 1977 season, and the city went without a pro team until 1993. The New Orleans Zephyrs came to New Orleans by way of Denver, Colorado, in 1993. With the arrival of the Colorado Rockies Major League Baseball expansion team, the city's Denver Zephyrs were forced to relocate.

Louisiana lawyer and business promoter Robert E. Couhig, Jr. led the effort to relocate the team to New Orleans. The "Zephyr" name was appropriate for New Orleans, too, as the Zephyr Roller Coaster was a popular ride at the Pontchartrain Beach amusement park (which had closed in 1983). The New Orleans Zephyrs remained in the American Association through 1997. The circuit disbanded following the season, and they joined the Pacific Coast League in 1998.

The Zephyrs won the 1998 PCL championship and went on to win the Triple-A World Series against the Buffalo Bisons, 3–1. The Zephyrs were also slated to participate in the 2001 championship series with the Tacoma Rainiers, but the playoffs were cancelled in the wake of the September 11 attacks, and the teams were named co-champions.

The Zephyrs finished out the last portion of their home games for the 2005 Pacific Coast League season three days before Hurricane Katrina hit the City of New Orleans, and though Zephyr Field sustained moderate damage, the team was able to open the 2006 season at home, making them the first professional team in New Orleans to do so after the hurricane.

On May 5–6, 2006, the Zephyrs and Nashville Sounds participated in a 24-inning game at Nashville, Tennessee's Herschel Greer Stadium which was played over the course of two days and lasted a total of eight hours and seven minutes. The game matched the longest game, in terms of innings played, in PCL history. The Zephyrs scored once in the eighth inning and once in the ninth, and the teams remained tied through 18 innings before curfew was called. New Orleans won, 5–4, on the second day on a Wiki González RBI single. The Zephyrs set 12 franchise records, including striking out a league-record 29 times.

In 2008, the Zephyrs' season ended three days early due to the approach of Hurricane Gustav. When it became apparent that Gustav would hit the Gulf Coast on September 1, they cancelled their games of August 30 through September 1.

On September 22, 2008, the Zephyrs became the Triple-A affiliate of the Florida Marlins (now the Miami Marlins). In October 2009, the team unveiled a new logo with the letter Z set against a fleur-de-lis.

The Zephyrs rebranded for the 2017 season. A name-the-team contest was held in search of a new team name to be accompanied by a new color scheme and logos by Brandiose. The seven finalist monikers were Baby Cakes, Crawfish, King Cakes, Night Owls, Po'boys, Red Eyes, and Tailgators. On November 15, the team unveiled Baby Cakes as the new team name and purple, green, and gold as the new team colors, as well as a unique promotion to promote the name: any child born in the state of Louisiana during 2017 was eligible for a lifetime pass to Baby Cakes games, and would be entered into a raffle wherein the winner would receive a full four-year tuition to a state college in Louisiana upon their 18th birthday in 2035. As part of the rebrand, the team's stadium, Zephyr Field, was changed to Shrine on Airline.

The name change was met with mixed reactions. Some fans found the new moniker and logos appealing, and the team reported increased merchandise sales after the announcement. Others expressed disappointment in the new name via social media, claiming it to be an unsuitable name for a sports team and that it did not accurately reflect local culture. At the time of the branding announcement, the team noted fan interest in retaining the Zephyrs moniker, but pointed out that the name had relocated from Denver to New Orleans and had no regional ties or significance other than the roller coaster at Pontchartrain Beach which closed in 1983.

On April 14, 2017, Baby Cakes pitchers Scott Copeland (7 IP), Hunter Cervenka (1 IP), and Brandon Cunniff (1 IP) combined to pitch a no-hitter against the Iowa Cubs.

On September 2, 2019, the PCL Triple-A New Orleans Baby Cakes played their final game ever as the "Baby Cakes" on the road against the Oklahoma City Dodgers in Oklahoma City with a 10-1 win over the Dodgers to cap off 27 years of Triple-A baseball in the Big Easy since the team relocated there in 1993.  

The team relocated to Wichita, Kansas, in 2020 and re-branded as the Wichita Wind Surge. After the 2021 MiLB reorganization, the team was not invited back as a Triple-A affiliate and was instead invited to serve as a Double-A team. New Orleans hopes to bring a Double-A South team to replace the PCL Triple-A franchise.

Longtime New Orleans sports public address announcer Doug Moreau joined the game day staff in 2003 as the organization's fifth stadium announcer and remained behind the microphone for 13 seasons, giving him the longest stretch in the organization's time in New Orleans. J.L. Vangilder was the official scorer from the beginning of the team's time in New Orleans until June 2014. At that point, Moreau took on the dual role as official scorer and announcer for the remainder of the 2014 season and much of the 2015 season.

References

 
Baseball teams established in 1993
Defunct Pacific Coast League teams
American Association (1902–1997) teams
Professional baseball teams in Louisiana
Miami Marlins minor league affiliates
New York Mets minor league affiliates
Washington Nationals minor league affiliates
Houston Astros minor league affiliates
Milwaukee Brewers minor league affiliates
1993 establishments in Louisiana
Baseball teams disestablished in 2019
2019 disestablishments in Louisiana
Defunct baseball teams in Louisiana